Jochen Hahn (born 18 April 1974, in Altensteig) is a German truck race driver. Team Hahn Racing participates at the ETRC, driving a Mercedes race truck until 2007, when Mercedes decided to stop participating at the ETRC in 2007. Since 2008, the team has raced a MAN race truck. The 2008 truck was built in just 8 weeks. Following nine years at the wheel of an MAN race truck, the team of the four-time European Truck Racing Champion switched makes. As the 2017 season began, Team Hahn Racing started piloting Iveco race trucks.

Career 
Jochen Hahn has competed at the FIA European Truck Racing Championship since 2000, the year he took over the race-truck steering wheel from his father and current team manager Konrad Hahn.
Konrad Hahn started his career at the European championship in 1996, achieving three podium positions and a fifth rank on the overall standings by 1999. That same year he survived a major crash unharmed. During the race at the Circuit Zolder, his truck crashed into a wall at 156 km/h (97 mi/h). He then stopped driving at the ETRC and his son Jochen Hahn took over the driver's seat. After his first season in 2000, Jochen Hahn ranked fourth in overall standings. Between 2000 and 2010 he continuously finished the season ranking between sixth and third on the overall standings.

In 2011, 2012 and 2013 as Jochen Hahn and his Team Hahn Racing won the FIA European Truck Racing Championship.

Before Hahn, only Curt Göransson (1988,1989 and 1990: Class B title) and Heinz-Werner Lenz (1997, 1998 and 1999: Race-Trucks Class title) had managed to win three titles in a row. Jochen Hahn and his team are the first ones to accomplish such a success since the Super-Race-Truck class was abolished in 2006 thus leaving a single class at the championship. Owing to this success, the race truck of the third hat-trick European champion in the history of the European Truck Racing Championship was labelled with the number 1 once more throughout the 2014 season. In addition, Jochen Hahn was voted "most beloved truck racer" for the sixth time in a row by the visitors of the 2013 Truck Grand Prix on Nürburgring.

Following two seasons (2014 and 2015) finishing vice champion and third, Jochen Hahn and his team once again won the European Truck Racing Championship in 2016 – thus collecting the 4th title piloting an MAN race truck built by the team itself. Jochen Hahn achieved his 100th race victory and was honored with the Drivers Driver Award.

After nine successful years driving race trucks of the same brand, the team decided to break fresh ground as the 2017 season began – piloting an Iveco race truck for the first time ever in the team's history. After switching from Mercedes-Benz to MAN race trucks in 2008, switching to Iveco is the second significant change of makes the team performed. In the end, Jochen Hahn finished vice-champion once again in 2017.

In 2018, Team Hahn Racing would once again start the season piloting a completely new Iveco race truck. Jochen was consistently in the fight for podium finishes all season and was able to secure his fifth European Championship at Le Mans, one round before the end of the season.

For 2019, Team Hahn Racing raised the bar yet again, as Jochen Hahn claimed 12 of the first 13 pole positions and won at least one race on every race day for the first seven rounds of the ETRC season, capping off a dominant season by securing his record sixth European Championship in Race 2 at Le Mans, a full six races before season's end. With such, Hahn is the most successful truck race driver of all time.

Titles and Successes 

2008: Fourth (4th) on the overall standings, second at the team championship, most beloved truck racer.
2009: Third (3rd) on the overall standings, second at the team championship, most beloved truck racer.
2010: Third (3rd) on the overall standings, most beloved truck racer.
2011: European Truck Racing Champion, most beloved truck racer.
2012: European Truck Racing Champion, most beloved truck racer.
2013: European Truck Racing Champion (hat-trick), most beloved truck racer.
2014: European Truck Racing Vice-Champion
2015: Third (3rd) on the overall standings
2016: European Truck Racing Champion (for the 4th time), 100th victory at FIA European Truck Racing Championships, Drivers Driver Award (chosen by all of the competitors)
2017: European Truck Racing Vice-Champion on the team's first Iveco race truck

References

External links 
Official website of his Team Hahn Racing
Joachen Hahn's profile at Truckracing.de
Chronicle of Team Hahn Racing

1974 births
German racing drivers
Racing drivers from Baden-Württemberg
People from Calw (district)
Sportspeople from Karlsruhe (region)
Living people